The Lane Anderson Award is an annual award presented to Canadian non-fiction science in two categories; adult and young readers. It is funded by the Fitzhenry Family Foundation, and headed by Sharon Fitzhenry and Hollister Doll.  Winners receive a plaque and a prize of 10,000 dollars. Winners are selected based on a book's relevance to current events and on its ability to relate scientific issues to everyday life.

Winners

Young Readers

Adult

References

Canadian non-fiction literary awards
Science writing awards
Awards established in 2011
2011 establishments in Canada